Vietnamese-Japanese Foreign Language-Technology College is located in E6, Quế Võ Industrial Zone, Quế Võ District, Bắc Ninh Province, Vietnam.

References

Universities in Vietnam